Stanoje Jocić (Serbian Cyrillic: Станоје Јоцић; born 5 June 1932) was a Serbian football player and a Yugoslav international.

Born in Skopje in present-day North Macedonia, Jocić came to football relatively late, joining Belgrade-based's BSK youth academy in 1948, at the age of 16. He had his professional debut in the 1952 season, in which he was Yugoslav league's top goalscorer with 13 goals in 13 appearances for BSK.

He left BSK in 1954 and went on to have a three-season spell with cross-city rivals FK Partizan, for whom he scored 16 goals in 43 league appearances, before returning to his original club in 1957 (which had been renamed in the meantime OFK Belgrade). He spent two more seasons with OFK, including the 1958–59 season which the club spent in the Yugoslav Second League, before retiring in 1959.

Jocić was also capped for the Yugoslavia national football team four times between 1952 and 1954, all in friendlies, and scored two goals for the national team. He scored both goals in his debut on 2 November 1952 against Egypt at the JNA Stadium in Belgrade, a 5–0 win for Yugoslavia.

External links
Stanoje Jocić profile at the Serbia national football team website 

Footballers from Skopje
1932 births
Living people
Serbian footballers
Yugoslav footballers
Yugoslavia international footballers
OFK Beograd players
FK Partizan players
NK Čelik Zenica players
Yugoslav First League players
Serbs of North Macedonia
Association football forwards